Luc Agbala Watékou (23 September 1947 – 18 October 2010) was a Togo international football forward and referee.

Playing career
Born in Kandé, Agbala began playing club football for local side Diables Rouges de Lomé, now Dynamic Togolais. He made his first division debut in 1966, scoring a goal in the match. He would lead the Togo league in scoring twice and won the championship with Dynamic Togolais in 1970 and 1971.

In 1972, Agbala moved to France to study physiotherapy. He returned to Togo and played for Lomé I, a fusion of Dynamic Togolais, Etoile Filante de Lomé and Modèle Lomé. He helped the club reach the semi-finals of the 1977 African Cup of Champions Clubs.

Agbala made eleven appearances for the senior Togo national football team and participated in the 1972 African Cup of Nations finals, Togo's first.

Officiating career
After he retired from playing football, Agbala took officiating courses and became an international referee. He officiated matches until 1992, including a 1986 World Cup qualifier between Sierra Leone and Morocco. He also was the executive director of the Stade Omnisports de Lomé.

Personal
Agbala died in Paris at age 63 on 18 October 2010.

References

External links
Profile at Worldreferee.com

1947 births
2010 deaths
People from Kara Region
Togolese footballers
Togo international footballers
1972 African Cup of Nations players
Association football forwards
Togolese football referees
21st-century Togolese people